Florida's 10th House District elects one member of the Florida House of Representatives. The district is represented by Chuck Brannan. This district is located in North Central Florida, and encompasses part of the inland First Coast, as well as small parts of the Gainesville metropolitan area and the Jacksonville metropolitan area. The district covers all of Baker County, Columbia County, Hamilton County, Suwannee County, and part of northern Alachua County. The largest city in the district is Lake City. As of the 2010 Census, the district's population is 156,423.

This district contains Florida Gateway College, located in Lake City. The district also contains a small military presence at Lake City Gateway Airport.

Representatives from 1967 to the present

See also 

 Florida's 3rd Senate district
 Florida's 5th Senate district
 Florida's 8th Senate district
 Florida's 2nd congressional district
 Florida's 3rd congressional district
 Florida's 5th congressional district

References 

10
Baker County, Florida
Columbia County, Florida
Hamilton County, Florida
Suwannee County, Florida
Alachua County, Florida